Nick Bell (born 17 December 1983) is a founding partner at Attention Capital and former vice president of content at Snap Inc., parent company of Snapchat, where he reported directly to CEO Evan Spiegel. Prior to Snap, Bell was Senior Vice President of Digital at News Corporation.

Early life and education
Bell was born in Alnwick, Northumberland, England and attended the Royal Grammar School in Newcastle. His father is a farmer and his mother a schoolteacher.

Career
In August 2019 Bell was part of the founding team of Attention Capital, a media and technology holding company. Prior to Attention Capital Bell spent 5 years at Snapchat joining from News Corp in early 2014 and was described as one of Spiegel's closest lieutenants. Bell was in charge of leading the company's content strategy, including the introduction of the Live Stories and Discover features to the Snapchat app.

In November 2018, Bell announced in a company-wide email that he was leaving Snap. In March 2019, he joined business incubator startup Human Ventures as a co-managing director of its "attention economy" portfolio.

Honours and awards
 In 2016 Bell was named by the magazine Fast Company as 21st on its list of the "100 of the most creative business people" in 2016
 In 2016 he was listed on LinkedIn's Next Wave - Top Professionals 35 and Under Changing the Way We Do Business
 In 2016 he was featured in the Variety's Digital Entertainment Execs to Watch 2016 report
 In 2016 he was awarded first place in The Hollywood Reporter's ranking of L.A.'s Most Powerful Digital Players
 In 2017 he was listed at position 77 in the Billboard Power 100 List in 2017.

References

1983 births
Living people
English child businesspeople
21st-century English businesspeople
People educated at the Royal Grammar School, Newcastle upon Tyne
People from Alnwick
English emigrants to the United States